Har Nof (lit. scenic mountain) is a neighborhood on a hillside on the western boundary of Jerusalem with a population of 20,000 residents, primarily Orthodox Jews.

History
In Talmudic times, Har Nof was an agricultural settlement that served Jerusalem. Remains of ancient wine presses, farmhouses, and terraces built 1,500 years ago have been unearthed on the outskirts of Har Nof. The first homes in modern Har Nof were built in the early 1980s. In 1984, the Bostoner Rebbe, Grand Rabbi Levi Yitzchok Horowtiz, decided to establish a center in Har Nof in Jerusalem, which was instrumental in building up the neighborhood's Orthodox community.

Geography
Har Nof is a terraced neighborhood on the slopes of a mountain that sits 813 meters (2667 feet) above sea level. Due to the topography, many of the multi-storey apartment buildings have entrances on both sides of the building – one to reach the lower floors, and another to reach the higher floors. Some streets are connected by long flights of stairs. At the foot of Har Nof lies the 1,200 dunam Jerusalem Forest (Yaar Yerushalayim), planted in the 1950s as a green lung around the city.

Demography

The majority of the residents of Har Nof are Orthodox Jews, both Haredi and Dati Leumi. Many residents are olim (immigrants). The neighborhood has a large community of English-speaking olim, and notable French-speaking and Spanish-speaking communities. There are also communities of Ger and Vizhnitz Hasidim, as well many Sephardi and Mizrahi Jews. The former Sefardic chief rabbi and leader of the Shas party, Rabbi Ovadia Yosef, lived in Har Nof. Spiritual leaders of the Ashkenazi Haredi community who reside in Har Nof are Rabbi Moishe Sternbuch of the Edah HaChareidis; the Bostoner Rebbe, Rabbi Mayer Alter Horowitz of Congregation Givat Pinchas (The Boston Shul); Rabbi Beryl Gershenfeld, Rosh Yeshiva of Har Nof's Machon Yaakov and Machon Shlomo yeshivas; and Rabbi Yitzchak Mordechai Rubin of Kehilat Bnei Torah.

Synagogues and public institutions

Rabbi David Yosef is the head of the Yachveh Da'at Kollel and the chief rabbi of Har Nof. Har Nof has a large number of synagogues, yeshivas, and Torah study institutions, among them are: Imrei Shefer, Boston Shul, Kehilat Zichron Yosef, Heichal Hatorah, Yeshiva Pachad Yitzchok, Machon Shlomo, Yeshivat Lev Aharon, and Machon Yaakov. The campuses of Neve Yerushalayim and She'arim College of Jewish Studies for Women are located in Har Nof, as is Yechaveh Da'at, Rabbi Ovadia Yosef's synagogue and spiritual headquarters.

On 18 November 2014, an attack occurred at the Kehilat Bnei Torah synagogue. Two Arab terrorists from East Jerusalem entered the synagogue with knives, a meat cleaver, and a pistol, inflicting heavy wounds on their victims who were at morning prayers, killing five and injuring eight - four of them seriously. In the ensuing gun battle, the two attackers were shot dead, and one of the policemen who attended the scene, a Druze, later died of his wounds.

Transportation
The neighborhood is linked to the city center by Kanfei Nesharim and Beit Hadfus Streets, with a number of bus lines providing public transportation.

Communal activism
The residents of Har Nof founded Shomera, a non-profit environmental protection association to thwart the building of high-rise luxury towers that would block the view of the Jerusalem Forest. Emergency medical care in Har Nof is provided by the volunteer group Hachovesh. Em Habanim is a volunteer organization founded in 1995 by Malka Yarom, a Har Nof resident who opened her home to religious divorcees who had nowhere to take their children on the Sabbath. The organization now has a membership of 300, and offers support to single-parent families in the Orthodox Jewish sector.

Notable residents
 Aryeh Deri (born 1959), Shas politician
 Beatie Deutsch (nee Rabin; born 1989), ultra-Orthodox Jewish American-Israeli marathon runner
Ovadia Yosef (1920 – 2013)  Iraqi-born Talmudic scholar, posek, Sephardi Chief Rabbi of Israel (1973 – 1983), a founder and spiritual leader of Shas party

References

External links 

 har nof website (English)

Neighbourhoods of Jerusalem
Orthodox Jewish communities in Jerusalem